Pouri Rakete-Stones (born 17 June 1997) is a New Zealand rugby player who plays as a prop for the  in Super Rugby and  in New Zealand's domestic National Provincial Championship competition.

Early career

Rakete-Stones attended and played rugby for Napier Boys High School. During his two years in Napier Boys' First XV team, he played mostly at hooker, but he currently prefers playing at prop. He also played age-grade rugby for Hawke's Bay and was the inaugural winner of the Graeme Lowe award for the Hawke's Bay Rugby Academy Player of the Year in 2016.

In 2015, Rakete-Stones was named in the Hurricanes U18 team to play their Crusaders U18 counterparts.

Senior career

In 2017, Rakete-Stones was - for the first time - named in the  squad for the Mitre 10 Cup. He made his Magpies debut, off the bench, on 19 August 2017 against . While he played his first two seasons mostly at tighthead prop, in 2018 all off the bench, he has since established himself as a regular starter at loosehead prop.

On 12 November 2019, the  announced their squad for the 2020 Super Rugby season, which for the first time included Pouri Rakete-Stones. Rakete-Stones earned his first full contract because of his excellent form for Hawke's Bay in the Mitre 10 Cup. Particularly his ability to cover both loosehead and tighthead prop, as well as being a strong scrummager and strong ball carrier, were highlighted in the announcement.

International career

Despite not being part of the group of players invited to attend the New Zealand Under-20 development camps that year, Rakete-Stones was named in the squad for the 2016 Oceania Rugby Under 20 Championship. He played in one of the two matches of that year's series against . He played in all three games and New Zealand retained the Oceania title.

On 8 May 2017, Rakete-Stones was named in the New Zealand Under-20 squad for the 2017 World Rugby Under 20 Championship in Georgia. He played in all New Zealand's games, except the first pool game. He scored two tries during the tournament, one of them in the record 64-17 win over England in the final. New Zealand claimed its 6th World Rugby U20 Championship title that year.

Rakete-Stones played for the New Zealand Universities team that toured Japan, in 2018.

In 2019, Rakete-Stones - who is of Ngāpuhi descent - was called into the Māori All Blacks squad for the two-test series against Fiji as an injury replacement for Ben May. He made his Māori All Blacks debut, off the bench, in the second match in Rotorua. On 5 December 2020, Rakete-Stones earned his first start for the Māori All Blacks - replacing injured Marcel Renata - in a one-off match against Moana Pasifika in Hamilton.

He made his debut for the side – via the bench – on 13 November 2022 against the Barbarians.

Reference list

External links
itsrugby.co.uk profile

1997 births
Living people
People educated at Napier Boys' High School
New Zealand rugby union players
Rugby union props
Hurricanes (rugby union) players
Hawke's Bay rugby union players
Māori All Blacks players
Ngāpuhi people
Rugby union players from Auckland